XHCR-FM 96.3/XECR-AM 1340 is a combo radio station in Morelia, Michoacán. It is owned by Grupo TRENU and carries a grupera format known as La Z.

History
XECR received its concession on June 23, 1954. It was owned by J. Manuel Treviño Morfin — the namesake of its concessionaire. Grupo TRENU is named for the Treviño Núñez family.

References

Radio stations in Michoacán
Radio stations established in 1954